Save Me is a Canadian comedy-drama web series, which debuted on the Canadian Broadcasting Corporation's CBC Comedy web platform in 2017. The series stars Fab Filippo as Goldie, a paramedic who acts as a first responder in a different medical emergency each episode.

The show's cast also includes Amy Matysio, Suresh John, Loretta Yu, John Bourgeois, Emma Hunter, Lucky Onyekachi Ejim, Brent Carver, Conrad Coates and Dov Tiefenbach.

Hunter won the Canadian Screen Award for Best Actress in a Web Program or Series at the 6th Canadian Screen Awards. CBC Television ran the series terrestrially in 2018, following which it received five further Canadian Screen Award nominations in the television categories at the 7th Canadian Screen Awards, for Best Actor in a Drama Program or Limited Series (Filippo), Best Actress in a Drama Program or Limited Series (Matysio), Best Supporting Actor in a Drama Program or Limited Series (Carver), Best Direction in a Drama Program or Limited Series (Filippo) and Best Writing in a Drama Program or Limited Series (Filippo).

The second season premiered on CBC Gem in 2019.

Episodes

Season 1 (2017)

Season 2 (2019)

References

External links

2017 Canadian television series debuts
2017 web series debuts
Canadian comedy-drama web series
CBC Gem original programming